Koottickal is a town at the base of Western Ghats mountain ranges in the Kottayam district, Kerala. There are streams and waterfalls in the surrounding places. The Muthukora Hills ( above MSL) are nearby. Urban centres in Kottayam and Ernakulam districts can be viewed from the top of Muthukora Hills.

Location
This village is situated on the banks of Manimala River; Kuttikkanam, Peermade and Thekkady Forest Reserve are close by. St. George's High School is one of the oldest high schools in the Kottayam district.

Economy
Rubber is a prime crop in Koottickal, one of the first places in India where it was cultivated. The Irish planter, John Joseph Murphy nurtured his rubber plantations here. The tomb of Murphy is situated atop the nearby hillock in Yendayaar. The old-world charm of British plantations is still around, with purity of village life. It is one of the most beautiful places in Kottayam district.

Koottickal can be reached from Kochi and Thiruvananthapuram International Airports via Kottayam. All the buses to Elamkadu and Yendayar pass through Koottickal.

Schools
Vettickanam KCMLPS
St. George's HS
CMS LPS
KMJ Public School
Little Buds SNDP EMS
JJMMHSS Higher secondary school

Churches
St. George Catholic Forane Church, Koottickal 
St Luke's CSI Church, Koottickal 
St Mary's Orthodox Church, Koottickal

Temples
Palakkunnu Sreedarmasastha Temple, 3 rd mile, Koottickal
Thalunkal Devi Temple, Koottickal

Masjid
Koottickal Muhyadheen Juma Masjid

How to Reach
 Kottayam - Ponkunnam - Kanjirappally - Koottickal 
 Kochi/Cochin -Thalayolapparambu - Ettumanoor-Pala - Ponkunnam - Kanjirappally - Koottickal 
 Thiruvananthapuram - Kottarakkara - Adoor - Pathanamthitta - Ranni - Erumeli - Koottickal 
 Thekkady - Kumily -Vandiperiyar-Peerumedu-Kuttikkanam- Mundakayam-Koottickal 
 Angamaly - Muvattupuzha -Thodupuzha-Erattupetta-Poonjar-Kavali - Koottickal 
 Sabarimala - Pampa - Erumely  - Koottickal 

AC Volvo bus service is available from Technopark to Mundakayam, by KSRTC.

Nearest Airport
Cochin International Airport

Nearest Railway Station
Kottayam

References

Villages in Kottayam district